Pachilaipalli ( Paccilaippaḷḷi) is a strategically important village in the northern province of Sri Lanka situated in the Jaffna Peninsula.

References

Pachchilaipalli DS Division
Populated places in Kilinochchi District